Matthew Christopher "Matt" Lutz (born October 15, 1978) is an American film, television, and theater actor, who portrays Phil Newberry on the Hallmark Channel's McBride murder-mystery series, and has had significant roles in the feature films A Walk to Remember, Bringing Down the House, and End of the Spear. Lutz graduated from the University of North Carolina Wilmington. Prior to that, Lutz graduated from Charles D. Owen High School in Black Mountain, North Carolina.

As a solo recording artist, Matt released his debut album entitled High Road in 2012.

Selected film/TV credits

Sudden Death! (2010) (Independent short film)
Port City (2009) (Independent feature film)
McBride: Requiem (2007) (TV movie)
McBride: Semper Fi (2006) (TV movie)
McBride: Dogged (2006) (TV movie)
McBride: Fallen Idol (2005) (TV movie)
McBride: Anybody Here Murder Marty? (2005) (TV movie)
McBride: Tune In for Murder (2005) (TV movie)
McBride: The Doctor Is Out...Really Out (2005) (TV movie)
McBride: It's Murder, Madam (2005) (TV movie)
McBride: Murder Past Midnight (2005) (TV movie)
McBride: The Chameleon Murder (2005) (TV movie)
End of the Spear (2005) (feature film)
Murder Without Conviction (2004) (TV movie)
Las Vegas (appeared in one episode in 2003) (TV series)
Bringing Down the House (2003) (feature film)
Boston Public (appeared in one episode in 2003) (TV series)
7th Heaven (appeared in one episode in 2003) (TV series)
A Walk to Remember (2002) (feature film)
Amy & Isabelle (2001) (TV movie)
Dawson's Creek (appeared in two episodes in 1999) (TV series)
Legacy (appeared in one episode in 1998) (TV series)

Selected theatre credits

Fall 2003: Played the role of Lt. George Yolland in Translations, the Irish drama by Brian Friel at Actors Co-op; Hollywood, California.
Fall 2004: Played the role of Herman in the Frank Loesser musical The Most Happy Fella at Actors Co-op; Hollywood, California.
Spring 2006: Played the role of Jack in Into The Woods, the musical by Stephen Sondheim, at Actors Co-op; Hollywood, California.
Summer 2006: Understudied the role of Jon (performed) in the Los Angeles premiere of the Jonathan Larson (RENT) musical tick, tick...BOOM!
Spring 2006: Understudied the role of The Man in the World Premiere of the musical A Time for Love by Richard Maltby, Jr. and David Shire at Rubicon Theatre; Ventura, California.
Spring 2007: Played the role of Elmo Green in the Los Angeles premiere of the musical Tales of Tinseltown at Actors Co-op; Hollywood, California.
Summer 2007: Played the roles of Herman in The Most Happy Fella and Frank in "Show Boat" at Utah Festival Opera; Logan, Utah.
Fall 2007: Played the role of Jimmy Smith in the musical Thoroughly Modern Millie at the Welk Resort Theatre; Escondido, California.
Winter 2008: Played the role of Courier in the musical 1776 at Actors Co-op; Hollywood, California.
Spring 2008: Played the role of Raleigh in the play Last Train to Nibroc by Arlene Hutton in Black Mountain, North Carolina and Lindsay, Oklahoma alongside his wife, Christy.
Fall 2008 - Winter 2009: Understudied the roles of Nick (performed), Streffy, and Nelson in the new musical Glimpses of the Moon by John Mercurio and Tajlei Levis, and directed by Marc Bruni, at the Oak Room of the Algonquin Hotel in New York City.
Spring 2010: Played the role of Nick D'Angelo in the new play Yours, Isabel by Christy Hall, produced at Fort Fringe, Washington, DC, in conjunction with the Capital Fringe Festival's first annual WATTAGE series.
Summer 2010: Originated the role of Seth in the new musical Trails by Christy Hall, Jeff Thomson, and Jordan Mann, produced by Actors Co-op, Hollywood, CA, as part of the 2010 Festival of New American Musicals.
Fall 2010: Played the role of Seth in the musical Trails by Christy Hall, Jeff Thomson, and Jordan Mann at the TBG Theatre in New York, NY, as part of the 2010 New York Musical Theatre Festival.
Spring 2011:  Played the role of Seth in the musical Trails by Christy Hall, Jeff Thomson, and Jordan Mann off-Broadway at New World Stages in New York, NY, in two industry readings.
Spring 2011:  Played the role of Jon in the musical tick, tick...BOOM! at Innovation Theatre Works in Bend, Oregon.  
Summer 2011:  Played the role of Nick D'Angelo in the world premiere of Yours, Isabel by Christy Hall at the Edinburgh Festival FRINGE in Edinburgh, Scotland.
Fall 2011:  Played the role of Bud in the new Broadway musical Bonnie & Clyde at the Gerald Schoenfeld Theatre in New York, NY.
Summer 2012:  Played the role of Sheriff Joe Sutter in the musical The Spitfire Grill at Flat Rock Playhouse, the State Theater of North Carolina.
Winter 2013:  Played the role of Jake in the play The Understudy by Theresa Rebeck at North Carolina Stage Company in Asheville, North Carolina.  
Summer/Fall 2013:  Played the role of Detective Fix (and 8 others) in the off Broadway revival of the play Around the World in 80 Days at the YOW! Theater in New York, NY.
Fall 2014:  Played the roles of Dr. Fine and Dr. Madden in the musical Next to Normal at Center Stage in Baltimore, Maryland.

External links
 

1978 births
Living people
American male film actors
American male television actors
American male stage actors
Wake Forest University alumni
Appalachian State University alumni
University of North Carolina at Wilmington alumni
People from Black Mountain, North Carolina